Fernando María Muñoz y Borbón (April 27, 1838 – December 7, 1910), or Fernando Muñoz, 2nd Duke of Tarancón and Riánsares, was the second son and fourth child of the Maria Christina, Regent of Spain, and her morganatic husband Agustín Fernando Muñoz, Duke of Riánsares. He was thus the half-brother of Queen Isabella II.

Biography 
In 1840, he was exiled from Spain with his parents when Baldomero Espartero, Prince of Vergara, took power, before returning to Madrid in 1843.

In 1847, the queen mother was again exiled to France with her children and settled in Rueil-Malmaison. During this exile, his older brother, Agustín died at the age of 18 without descendants on July 15, 1855. His two other brothers, Juan Muñoz, Count of Recuerdo, and José Muñoz, Count of Gracia, died as well. Fernando, as the only surviving son of the couple, inherits the titles of his older brother and becomes Duke of Tarancón and Viscount of Rostrollano.

In 1873, on the death of his father, he became the Duke of Riánsares and Montmorot. After the restoration of 1874, he returned to Spain under the reign of his nephew, Alfonso XII, who named him Grandee of Spain.

Marriage and descendants 
On September 11, 1861, he married Eladia Bernaldo de Quirós González de Cienfuegos who gave him eleven children:

 María Cristina Muñoz y Borbón de Quirós (1862),
 Eladia Muñoz y Borbón de Quirós (1863-1933),
 Fernando Muñoz y Borbón de Quirós (1864-1913), duc de Riansares y Tarancón,
 María Josefa Muñoz y Borbón de Quirós (1865-1947),
 Rita Muñoz y Borbón de Quirós (1865-1952),
 María del Consuelo Muñoz y Borbón de Quirós (1866-1947),
 María de los Dolores Muñoz y Borbón de Quirós (1866-1931),
 José Muñoz y Borbón de Quirós (1868-1891),
 Juan Bautista Muñoz y Borbón de Quirós (1870-1943),
 María de la Inmaculada Muñoz y Borbón de Quirós (1873-1914),
 Genoveva Muñoz y Borbón de Quirós (1875-1890).

References

Sources 
 Real Academia de la Historia: Diccionario Biográfico electrónico (DB~e) - Fernando María Muñoz y Borbón

External links 
 Historia de Tarancón – Ayuntamiento Tarancón

1838 births
1910 deaths
Dukes of Spain
Viscounts of Spain
Grandees of Spain